Embhuleni is the royal village of the eSwatini kingdom in South Africa's Mpumalanga province. It is now called Embhuleni Traditional Council or Embhuleni Royal Kraal and is one of South Africa's tribal authorities represented in the House of Traditional Leaders. Built by  King Mswati II in the mid-19th century as a military post to safeguard eSwatini land against a possible invasion by the Bapedi people before the Scramble for Africa, its official residence known as Embhuleni Royal Kraal is in Badplaas and is now responsible for administering the cultural affairs of the Swati people in Mpumalanga

History
It was built by the younger Mswati II while he was a heir apparent in 1842 in what was known as Eerstehoek district of the then province of Eastern Transvaal.

For some time during the 1800s, there was serious concern amongst eSwatini royal members about the threat posed by a possible invasion by the Pedi people. A group of Swati regiments led by the younger King Mswati II, who was a heir apparent during this time, arrived in Tjakastad area in 1842 and built the village. The name of the regiment was Umbhula and the area became Embhuleni as a result. Mswati II is recorded as the fiercest of eSwatini Kings. The official residence of Embhuleni was on the foot of the Mkhingoma Mountain.

Two more military camps were established in Malelane and Barberton. Its rule stretches across Mpumalanga's three regions (border to eSwatini, the regions are now called Gert Sibande, Nkangala and Ehlanzeni).

The people who lived at Embhuleni were subjected to the rule of the King's wife, Nandzi LaMagadlela Khumalo. Since then Embhuleni was moved to different portions several times. From Mkhingoma Mountain to Dlomodlomo mountain and later to the farm Welgevonden as well as farm Alexandria.

References

External references
HISTORY OF EMASWATI IN SA | Van Schaik
History of EmaSwati in SA

Swazi royalty